Buzzard Run is a stream in Ripley County in the U.S. state of Missouri. It is a tributary of the Little Black River.

The stream headwaters arise at  about one mile west of Fairdealing just north of US Route 160 at an elevation of about 475 feet. The stream flows south and east passing under Route 160 and Missouri Route B passing south of Fairdealing. The confluence is about 1.5 miles north of Naylor.

Some say Buzzard Run was so named on account of buzzards in the area, while others believe the creek has the name of the local Buzzard family.

See also
List of rivers of Missouri

References

Rivers of Ripley County, Missouri
Rivers of Missouri
Tributaries of the Black River (Arkansas–Missouri)